Orthobula is a genus of araneomorph spiders first described by Eugène Simon in 1897 as a member of Liocranidae. It was transferred to Corinnidae in 2002, to Phrurolithidae in 2014, and to Trachelidae in 2017.

Species
 it contains twenty species:
Orthobula bilobata Deeleman-Reinhold, 2001 – Indonesia (Sumatra, Borneo, Lesser Sunda Is.)
Orthobula calceata Simon, 1897 – Sierra Leone
Orthobula charitonovi (Mikhailov, 1986) – Eastern Mediterranean to Central Asia
Orthobula chayuensis Yang, Song & Zhu, 2003 – China
Orthobula crucifera Bösenberg & Strand, 1906 – China, Korea, Japan
Orthobula impressa Simon, 1897 (type) – India, Sri Lanka, Seychelles, Reunion
Orthobula mikhailovi Marusik, 2021 – Iran
Orthobula milloti Caporiacco, 1949 – Kenya
Orthobula puncta Yang, Song & Zhu, 2003 – China
Orthobula pura Deeleman-Reinhold, 2001 – Indonesia (Sulawesi)
Orthobula qinghaiensis Hu, 2001 – China
Orthobula quadrinotata Deeleman-Reinhold, 2001 – Indonesia (Sulawesi)
Orthobula radiata Simon, 1897 – South Africa
Orthobula sicca Simon, 1903 – Madagascar
Orthobula spiniformis Tso, Zhu, Zhang & Zhang, 2005 – Taiwan
Orthobula sudamericana Piñanez & Munévar, 2022 – Paraguay, Argentina
Orthobula tibenensis Hu, 2001 – China
Orthobula trinotata Simon, 1896 – Philippines
Orthobula yaginumai Platnick, 1977 – China
Orthobula zhangmuensis Hu & Li, 1987 – China

References

Araneomorphae genera
Spiders of Africa
Spiders of Asia
Taxa named by Eugène Simon
Trachelidae